Nick Pelling is a British-born computer programmer and investigative writer best known as the creator of the 1984 game Frak!.

Games

Developed

As Aardvark Software 
 Arcadians (1982)
 Zalaga (1983) (port of Galaga)
 Frak! (1984)
 Firetrack (1987)
 Sharkey's 3D Pool (1989)
 3D Pocket Pool (2001)

Independently 
 Bangkok Knights (1987)
 Shinobi (1989)
 Loopz (1990)
 Terminator 2: Judgment Day (1993)
 The Simpsons: Bartman Meets Radioactive Man (1993)
 The Pagemaster (1994)
 Mortal Kombat II (1994)
 Wolverine: Adamantium Rage (1994)
 Primal Rage (1995)
 Batman Forever (1995)
 The X-Files Game (1999)
 In Cold Blood (2000)
 Street Fighter Alpha 3 (2002)
 Kelly Slater's Pro Surfer (2002)
 Championship Manager 5 (2005)
 Buzz!: The Music Quiz (2005)
 Buzz!: The BIG Quiz (2006)
 Buzz!: The Mega Quiz (2007)
 Buzz!: The Hollywood Quiz (2007)
 Soldiers of Fortune (2013)

Ported

As Aardvark Software 
 Duke Nukem 3D (1997, PlayStation)

Independently 
 Dandy (1986, Commodore 64) in the capacity of '11th hour Software Salvage'
 Teenage Mutant Ninja Turtles (1990, Commodore 64)
 Battle Master (1991, Sega Genesis)
 Wing Commander (1992, AmigaOS)
 Dangerous Streets & Wing Commander (1994, Amiga CD32)

Interests in history 
Pelling published an article in the British magazine History Today, supporting a previous attribution of the invention of the telescope to a Gerundian named Joan Roget in 1590 and published a 2006 book on the Voynich manuscript, claiming it was written by 15th century North Italian architect Antonio Averlino (also known as "Filarete").

Books

References

External links
Pelling's website
Pelling's Cipher Mysteries website

1964 births
Alumni of Kingston University
Alumni of the University of Manchester
British computer programmers
Living people